Sthenias gahani is a species of beetle in the family Cerambycidae. It was described by Maurice Pic in 1912. It is known from China.

References

gahani
Beetles described in 1912